Louise Emily (Emma) Lomax (22 June 1873 – 29 August 1963) was an English composer and pianist. She was born in Brighton, daughter of the curator of Brighton Free Library and Museum, and studied at the Brighton School of Music and the Royal Academy of Music in London. She was a Goring Thomas Scholar from 1907–10 and won the Lucas Silver Medal.

After completing her studies, Lomax taught theory and counterpoint at the Royal Academy of Music.  She died in Brighton.

Works
Selected works include:
The Storm Bird, cantata (1902)
Prelude to Act II of The Marsh of Vervais

Lomax wrote professional articles including:
"Dr Ebenezer Prout -- and Bach," Music in Education, vol. 23 (July–August 1959), p. 76.

References

1873 births
1963 deaths
19th-century classical composers
20th-century classical composers
Women classical composers
English classical composers
People from Brighton
Alumni of the Royal Academy of Music
Academics of the Royal Academy of Music
20th-century English composers
20th-century English women musicians
19th-century British composers
Women music educators
20th-century women composers
19th-century women composers